Seven ships of the Royal Navy have borne the name HMS Harrier:

 , an 18-gun  launched in 1804 and lost around March 1809, presumed foundered off the Île de France.
 , an 18-gun Cruizer-class brig-sloop launched in 1813, sold in 1829
 , an 18-gun sloop-of-war launched in 1831, broken up in 1840
 , a 17-gun wood screw sloop-of-war launched in 1854, broken up in 1866
 , a two-gun schooner launched in 1881, sold in 1888
 , a  launched in 1894, sold in 1920
 , a  launched in 1934, sold in 1950
 HMS Harrier was also a Royal Naval shore establishment for radar research and training, near Dale, Pembrokeshire. It was commissioned in 1948 and closed in 1961.

References

Royal Navy ship names